The 2012 CONCACAF Men's Olympic Qualifying Championship was an international football tournament that was held in the United States from 22 March to 2 April 2012. The eight national teams involved in the tournament were required to register a squad of twenty players, two of whom had to be goalkeepers.

The final lists were published by CONCACAF.

The age listed for each player is on 22 March 2012, the first day of the tournament. A flag is included for coaches who are of a different nationality than their own national team. Players marked in bold have been capped at full international level.

Group A

El Salvador 
Coach: Mauricio Alfaro

Canada 
Coach:  Tony Fonseca

United States 
Coach: Caleb Porter

Cuba 
Coach: Raúl González Triana

Group B

Honduras 
Coach:  Luis Fernando Suárez

Panama 
Coach: Julio Dely Valdés

Trinidad and Tobago 
Coach: Angus Eve

Mexico 
Coach: Luis Fernando Tena

References

Squads